Befu Station (別府駅) may refer to:

 Befu Station (Fukuoka), a subway station in Fukuoka, Japan
 Befu Station (Hyogo), a train station in Kakogawa, Hyōgo Prefecture, Japan